or  is a mountain in the municipality of Narvik in Nordland county, Norway. The mountain has very smooth sides reaching all the way to the fjord. Stetind has an obelisk-shape which gives it a very distinct look. In 2002 it was voted to be the "National Mountain" of Norway by listeners of NRK.

Climbing
The mountain had several attempts at first ascents. First was the German Paul Güssfeldt and the Norwegian Martin Ekroll in the summer of 1888. The Dane Carl Hall and the Norwegian mountain guide Mathias Soggemoen attempted in 1889.

That cairn is now called Halls fortopp (elevation ). In 1904, William Cecil Slingsby also failed to reach the summit.

It was not until 30 July 1910 that Ferdinand Schjelderup, Carl Wilhelm Rubenson, and Alf Bonnevie Bryn finally reached the summit of Stetind. The weather conditions were good. It was Rubenson's 25th birthday, and he was given the honor of being first in the rope. The hardest part was to pass the smooth crag "Mysosten", which Rubenson finger traversed along a tiny crack. After this passage there was an easy climb to the summit. The same three climbers continued their 1910 tour by making first ascents of the Lofoten summits Svolværgeita and Trakta. Arne Næss, Ralph Høibakk, and K. Friis Baasted did the first winter climb of Stetind in 1963 on the eastern wall. In 1966, Arne Næss and four others were the first ones to summit via the west wall.

Name
The shape of the mountain has been compared with a ste which means "anvil" and the last element is the finite form of tind which means "mountain peak". Slingsby characterized Stetind as the ugliest mountain he ever saw.

Tourism 
Stetind is not a particularly popular tourist destination, despite being Norway's national mountain. It got a boom in tourism activity after the award, but the number of visitors returned to normal levels after a few years.

References

External links

Narvik
Mountains of Nordland
Tourist attractions in Nordland